Albanian Republican Union Party (in Albanian: Partia Bashkimi Republikan Shqiptar, abbreviated PBRSH) is a political party in Albania. It is led by Zane Llazi.

PBRSH is part of the coalition Democratic Movement for Integration.

See also 
 Albanian Republican Party / Partia Republikane Shqiptarë (PRSH)
 Republican Party of Albania / Partia Republikane e Shqipërisë

References 

Political parties in Albania